The Council of Thedosioupolis was a church synod held at Erzurum, in Armenia between February 631 and February 632 AD.

Background
The Armenian Apostolic Church, being Monophysit, had rejected the theological decisions of the Council of Chalcedon at the Second Council of Dvin. creating a schism between Armenia and the churches of Rome Byzantium and Antioch.

In light of this divergence from the rest of Christianity, there were calls within Armenia for restoration with the Churches that had adopted Chalcedon's canons. The Council was chaired by Cathilocos Ezr who called for a reunification with the Eastern Orthodox Church. and Emperor Heraclius attended accompanied by both Armenian and Greek patriarchs. The synod was part of the formation of schism between Armenian and Orthodox Christianity.

Outcome
The Council ultimately rejected the calls for reunification, and many of the differences are still being negotiated today.

See also
Council of Theodosiopolis (593)

References 

Armenian Apostolic Church
7th-century church councils
Fourth Council
Sasanian Armenia
Ecumenical councils
7th century in Armenia
Medieval Christian controversies